The Pushkin State Museum of Fine Arts (abbreviated as ) is the largest museum of European art in Moscow, located in Volkhonka street, just opposite the Cathedral of Christ the Saviour. The International musical festival Sviatoslav Richter's December nights has been held in the Pushkin Museum since 1981.

Etymology
Despite its name, the museum has no direct association with the Russian poet Alexander Pushkin, other than as a posthumous commemoration. The facility was founded by professor Ivan Tsvetaev (father of the poet Marina Tsvetaeva). Tsvetaev persuaded the millionaire and philanthropist Yuriy Nechaev-Maltsov and the architect Roman Klein of the urgent need to give Moscow a fine arts museum. After going through a number of name changes, particularly in the transition to the Soviet era and the return of the Russian capital to Moscow, the museum was finally renamed to honour Pushkin in 1937, the 100th anniversary of his death.

History 
During the Bolshevik revolution, works by French impressionists and modern artists were confiscated and then exhibited in the Hermitage Museum in Saint Petersburg before being privately stored. In 2019, those works reappeared and some of them rejoined the Pushkin museum. In 1981, the museum held the Moscow-Paris exhibition. In 2016, art historians discovered 59 Italian Renaissance sculptures in the Puschkin Museum that had been missing from Berlin’s collections since the Second World War.

In March 2022, the museum's deputy director Vladimir Opredelenov resigned to protest against Russia's invasion of Ukraine.

Building
The building of the Pushkin State Museum of Fine Arts was designed by Roman Klein and Vladimir Shukhov. Construction lasted from 1898 until early 1912, with Ivan Rerberg heading structural engineering effort on the museum site for the first 12 years.

In 2008, President Dmitri A. Medvedev announced plans for a $177 million restoration. A 22 billion rubles ($670 million) expansion, developed by Norman Foster in collaboration with local architectural firm Mosproject-5, was confirmed in 2009, but became mired in disputes with officials and preservationists and concern grew that it would not be completed on schedule for 2018. After Moscow's chief architect Sergei Kuznetsov issued an ultimatum, demanding that Foster take a more active role in the project and prove his commitment by coming to the Russian capital within a month, Norman Foster's firm resigned from the project in 2013. In 2014, Russian architect Yuri Grigoryan, and his firm Project Meganom, were chosen to take over the project. Grigoryan's design provides new modern buildings and, following the protest of heritage groups who campaigned to save the pre-revolutionary architecture, preserves the historic 1930s gas station near the Pushkin's main building inside a glass structure.

Collection
The holdings of the Pushkin State Museum of Fine Arts currently include around 700,000 paintings, sculptures, drawings, applied works, photographs, and archaeological and animalistic objects. The Department of Manuscripts houses documents on the museum's history; the scientific and epistolary heritage of its founder Ivan Tsvetaev (1847–1913), other museum workers, famous art historians, and artists; and archives from other museums that are also included in the Pushkin Museum holdings. The museum owns studios for research and restoration works and a Scientific Library.

Painting

The earliest monuments from the museum collection are pieces of Byzantine art: mosaics and icons. The early stage of development of Western European painting is represented by a relatively small, but very impressive, collection of Italian Primitives. The hall of early Italian art was opened on October 10, 1924, but the first original paintings were presented to the Alexander III Fine Arts Museum in 1910 by Mikhail Schekin (1871–1920), the Russian consul in Trieste, and include unique Old Master works such as painting by Giambattista Pittoni.

Graphic art

The Department of Prints and Drawings was founded in 1924, when the museum received the holdings of the Printing Cabinet of the Moscow Public and Rumyantsev Museum. In 1861, Alexander II made a valuable gift to the Printing Cabinet: the Moscow Public and Rumyantsev Museum received more than 20,000 prints from the Hermitage. Later, the department received a number of private collections from Dmitry Rovinsky (1824-1895) (Russian prints), Nikolay Mosolov (1846-1914) (etchings by Rembrandt, drawings by Dutch masters of the 17th century), and Sergey Kitaev (1864-1927) (Japanese prints).

Sculpture

The collection of Western European sculptures includes more than 600 pieces. The museum has expanded its holdings over the years and currently owns artworks from the 6th-21st centuries. The first artifacts presented to the Museum of Fine Arts were sculptures from Mikhail Schekin's collections. After the revolution, the museum received many sculptures from nationalized collections. In 1924, a few painting halls were opened in the museum.

Collection of decorative art pieces (Department of the Old Masters)
The collection of decorative art pieces from Europe includes around 2,000 items. The earliest are from the Middle Ages, and the set as a whole is very diverse.  It includes art pieces made from wood and bone, base and precious metals, stone, textiles, ceramics, and glass.  Of particular interest are the collection of ceramics that includes all major types of artworks and the collection of furniture.

Archaeological collection

The Museum of Fine Arts was intended primarily as a museum of classical arts. Ancient artifacts were the core and the main components of its collection, and the Department of Antiquity was one of the three major scientific departments. Its founder and director, Ivan Tsvetaev (1847-1913), was an expert in ancient art, as were his closest associates, Vladimir Malmberg (1860-1921) and Nikolay Scherbakov (1884-1933).

Egypt
Most of the objects presented in Hall No. 1 have been on display since the museum opening in 1912 and come from the collection of Vladimir Golenishchev (1856-1947).

Ancient civilizations
The museum holdings of genuine artifacts of Southwest Asia are based on the collection of famous Russian Orientalist and Egyptologist Vladimir Golenishchev.

Antiquity
The antique collection of the Pushkin State Museum of Fine Arts includes many genuine artifacts: more than 1,000 vessels, small plastic pieces, and sculptures.

Tsvetaev’s collection of casts
The collection of casts and copies, typical for European museums of the nineteenth century, is unique today in its preservation and consistency. With a similar cohesiveness, Tsvetaev wanted to present plastic art of the modern era and complete the collection with casts made from contemporary sculptures, where Auguste Rodin’s works would take the central place.  Unfortunately, the last part of his plan was not implemented due to a lack of funding after a fire broke out during construction.  Some casts and copies from the museum collection are the only genuine reproduction of artifacts lost during the World Wars.

Numismatic collection
Today, the holdings of the Numismatics Department of the Pushkin State Museum of Fine Arts form a collection in excess of 200,000 items and 3,000 volumes of the special library. It was started at Imperial Moscow University. In 1888, the collection was divided and formed the basis for the major numismatic collections of Moscow that belonged to the Historical Museum and the Alexander III Fine Arts Museum.

Since 1912, objects of ancient and Western European numismatics from the university collection were transferred to the Sculpture Department of the Fine Arts Museum and mostly kept packaged. By June 1925, museum custodians had grouped together a number of cases with coins, medals, and casts and created the Numismatic Cabinet located on the balcony of the White Hall. In 1945, the museum's Numismatic Cabinet became an independent department. It includes archaeological material from Central Asia, such as a hoard of Kushano-Sasanian coins acquired in 2002

Museum Quarter

The work on the Museum Quarter of the Pushkin State Museum of Fine Arts started in the late 2000s. In 2019–23, the Main Building of the Pushkin State Museum of Fine Arts will be reconstructed. After the reconstruction, nine museums will operate in the Museum Quarter.

Gallery

Directors 
1961-2013: Irina Antonova

References

Further reading
 William Craft Brumfield. The Origins of Modernism in Russian Architecture (Berkeley: University of California Press, 1991)

External links
 Official website
 Museum Quarter official website 
 The Morozov/Shchukin's collections, morozov-shchukin.com
 Pushkin Museum History, SmashPixels.com
 Pushkin Museum of Fine Arts (Moscow)
 The Opening of the Museum, English.tsvetayeva.com
 Photo (1024x768), otdihinfo.ru
Virtual tour of the Pushkin Museum provided by Google Arts & Culture

 
1912 establishments in the Russian Empire
Art museums and galleries in Moscow
Art museums established in 1912
Cultural heritage monuments of federal significance in Moscow
Egyptological collections in Russia
Museums of ancient Greece in Russia
Museums of Ancient Near East in Russia
Museums of ancient Rome in Russia
Plaster cast collections
Roof structures by Vladimir Shukhov
Tourist attractions in Moscow